Senator Stavisky may refer to:

Leonard P. Stavisky (1925–1999), New York State Senate
Toby Ann Stavisky (born 1939), New York State Senate